The following highways are numbered 299:

Canada
 Quebec Route 299

Japan
 Japan National Route 299

United States
  U.S. Route 299 (former)
  Alabama State Route 299
  Arkansas Highway 299
  California State Route 299
  Delaware Route 299
  Georgia State Route 299
  Iowa Highway 299 (former)
  Kentucky Route 299
  Maryland Route 299
  Minnesota State Highway 299
 New York:
  New York State Route 299
  County Route 299 (Erie County, New York)
  Ohio State Route 299 (former)
  Oklahoma State Highway 299 (former)
  Pennsylvania Route 299
  Tennessee State Route 299
 Texas:
  Texas State Highway 299 (former)
  Texas State Highway Spur 299
  Farm to Market Road 299 (proposed)
  Utah State Route 299
  Virginia State Route 299